"Hey DJ" is a song by Latin boy band CNCO. Two versions of the song were released simultaneously: a solo pop version, and a reggaeton version with additional vocals by Puerto Rican singer Yandel. The first one was released on April 4, 2017, with the second one being released two days after, on April 6, through Sony Music Latin. It is the lead single of their eponymous second studio album, CNCO.

Track listings
 Digital download
 "Hey DJ"  – 3:06
 Digital download
 "Hey DJ"  – 3:25
 Digital download
 "Hey DJ"  – 3:30

Live performances
The boy band performed "Hey DJ" with Yandel for the first time on television at the Billboard Latin Music Awards of 2017, where they took home three awards including Best New Artist.

Charts

Weekly charts

Year-end charts

Certifications

Meghan Trainor and Sean Paul remix

A remix of "Hey DJ" by CNCO, American singer-songwriter Meghan Trainor and Jamaican artist Sean Paul was released on November 9, 2018, by Sony Music Latin.

Music video
The music video was released on November 16, 2018. It features the band arriving in suits to a party in a mansion.

Charts

Weekly charts

Year-end charts

Certifications

References

2017 songs
2017 singles
2018 singles
Spanish-language songs
CNCO songs
Sony Music Latin singles
Meghan Trainor songs
Sean Paul songs
Yandel songs
Songs written by Yandel
Songs written by Meghan Trainor
Songs written by Sean Paul
Songs written by Matt Rad
Songs written by Edgar Barrera